Ebrahim Shehab (born 20 January 1986) is a Kuwaiti footballer who is a midfielder for the Kuwaiti Premier League club Al Kuwait.

References

1986 births
Living people
Kuwaiti footballers
Footballers at the 2006 Asian Games
Sportspeople from Kuwait City
Association football midfielders
Asian Games competitors for Kuwait
Kuwait international footballers
Kuwait SC players
Kuwait Premier League players